is a passenger railway station located in the city of Sagamihara, Kanagawa Prefecture, Japan, operated by the East Japan Railway Company (JR East).

Lines

Station layout
The station consists of a single island platform connected to a small station building by a footbridge. The station is unattended.

Platforms

History
On June 1, 1944, the Sagami Railway was nationalized and merged with the Japanese National Railways (JNR), at which time the station was renamed Banda Station. On April 1, 1987, with the dissolution and privatization of JNR, the station came under the operation of JR East.

The station building is scheduled to be rebuilt between September 2017 and spring 2018.

Passenger statistics
In fiscal 2014, the station was used by an average of 3,643 passengers daily (boarding passengers only).

Surrounding area
Kamimizo Minami High School

See also
 List of railway stations in Japan

References

External links

  

Stations of East Japan Railway Company
Railway stations in Japan opened in 1931
Railway stations in Sagamihara
Sagami Line